The 2014 Big Ten men's basketball tournament was the postseason men's basketball tournament for the Big Ten Conference held from March 13 through March 16, 2014 at Bankers Life Fieldhouse in Indianapolis, Indiana.  The tournament was the seventeenth annual Big Ten men's basketball tournament and third and final year to feature 12 teams. The championship was won by Michigan State who defeated Michigan in the championship game. As a result, Michigan State received the conference's automatic bid to the NCAA tournament. The win marked Michigan State's fourth tournament championship (tying them with Ohio State for the most championships) and second championship in three years. Branden Dawson was named the Tournament's Most Outstanding Player.

Seeds
All 12 Big Ten schools participated in the tournament. Teams were seeded by conference record, with a tiebreaker system used to seed teams with identical conference records. Seeding for the tournament was determined at the close of the regular conference season. The top four teams received a first-round bye. Tiebreaking procedures were unchanged from the 2013 tournament.

Game summaries

First round

Quarterfinals

Semifinals

Championship

 Attendance for the six sessions was 111,592.

Bracket

All-Tournament Team
 Branden Dawson, Michigan State – Big Ten tournament Most Outstanding Player
 Gary Harris, Michigan State
 Adreian Payne, Michigan State
 Nik Stauskas, Michigan
 LaQuinton Ross, Ohio State

See also
2014 Big Ten Conference women's basketball tournament

References

External links
Tournament results at BigTen.org

Big Ten men's basketball tournament
Tournament
Big Ten Conference men's basketball tournament
Big Ten men's basketball tournament